The Ilyushin Il-28 (NATO reporting name: Beagle) is a jet bomber of the immediate postwar period that was originally manufactured for the Soviet Air Forces. It was the Soviet Union's first such aircraft to enter large-scale production. It was also licence-built in China as the Harbin H-5. Total production in the USSR was 6,316 aircraft, and over 319 H-5s were built. Only 187 examples of the HJ-5 training variant were manufactured. In the 1990s hundreds remained in service with various air forces over 50 years after the Il-28 first appeared. The only H-5s in service currently are approximately 80 aircraft which operate with the Korean People's Air Force. 
The Il-28 has the USAF/DoD reporting name "Type 27" and NATO reporting name "Beagle", while the Il-28U trainer variant has the USAF/DoD reporting name "Type 30" and NATO reporting name Mascot.

Design and development
After a number of attempts at a four-engined bomber (the Lyulka TR-1 powered Ilyushin Il-22 and the unbuilt Rolls-Royce Derwent powered Ilyushin Il-24), the Ilyushin Design Bureau began development of a new jet-powered tactical bomber in late 1947. The new design took advantage of the sale of a number of Rolls-Royce Nene jet engines by Great Britain to the Soviet Union, which allowed Soviet engineers to quickly produce an unlicensed copy of the Nene, the RD-45, with Ilyushin designing the new bomber around two RD-45s.

The Il-28 was smaller than the previous designs and carried a crew of only three (pilot, navigator and gunner). It was also smaller than the competing design from the Tupolev design bureau, the three-engined (i.e. two Nenes and a Rolls-Royce Derwent) Tupolev Tu-73, which had been started long before the Ilyushin project, and flew before the design of the Il-28 was approved.

The Il-28 design was conventional in layout, with high, unswept wings and a swept horizontal tail and fin.  The engines were carried in bulky nacelles slung directly under the wings. The nosewheel retracted rearwards, while the mainwheels retracted forwards into the engine nacelles. The crew of three were accommodated in separate, pressurised compartments. The navigator, who also acted as bombardier, was accommodated in the glazed nose compartment and was provided with an OPB-5 bombsight based on the American Norden bombsight of the Second World War, while the pilot sat under a sideways opening bubble canopy with an armoured windscreen. The gunner sat in a separate compartment at the rear of the fuselage, operating a power driven turret armed with two Nudelman-Suranov NS-23 23 mm cannons with 250 rounds each. In service, the turret was sometimes removed as a weight saving measure.  While the pilot and navigator sat on ejector seats, the gunner had to parachute out of a hatch in the floor in the event of an emergency. Two more fixed, forward-firing 23 mm cannon with 100 rounds each were mounted under the nose and fired by the pilot, while a bomb bay was located in the fuselage, capable of holding four 100 kg (220 lb) bombs in individual containers, or single large bombs of up to 3,000 kg (6,600 lb) slung from a beam in the bomb bay.

One unusual design feature of the Il-28 was that the wings and tail were split horizontally through the centre of the wing, while the fuselage was split vertically at the centreline, allowing the separate parts to be built individually and fitted out with systems before being bolted together to complete assembly of the aircraft.  This slightly increased the weight of the aircraft structure, but eased manufacture and proved to be more economical.

The first prototype, powered by two imported Nenes, made its maiden flight on 8 July 1948, with Vladimir Kokkinaki at the controls.  Testing was successful, with the Il-28 demonstrating good handling and reaching a speed of 833 km/h (518 mph). It was followed on 30 December 1948 by the second prototype, with Soviet built RD-45 engines replacing the Nenes.  After the completion of state tests in early 1949 the aircraft was ordered into large scale production on 14 May 1949, with the Klimov VK-1, an improved version of the RD-45 to be used in order to improve the aircraft's performance. The first pre-production aircraft with VK-1 engines flew on 8 August 1949, and featured reshaped engine nacelles to reduce drag, while the radome for the navigation radar was moved from the rear fuselage to just aft of the nosewheel.

Full production in three factories started in September 1949, with service deliveries starting in early 1950, allowing 25 Il-28s to be displayed at the Moscow May Day parade of 1950 (as ordered by Joseph Stalin when it was ordered into production in 1949). The Il-28 soon became the standard tactical bomber in the Soviet forces and was widely exported.

Operational history

The Il-28 was widely exported, serving in the air arms of some 20 nations ranging from the Warsaw Pact to various Middle-Eastern and African air forces. Egypt was an early customer, and targeting Egyptian Il-28s on the ground was a priority for the Royal Air Force during the Suez Crisis and later by the Israeli Air Force during the Six-Day War, and Yom Kippur War.

Egyptian Il-28s also took part in the North Yemen Civil War, starting in 1963. In addition to attacks on the royalist forces, they also bombed the Saudi cities of Jizan, Najran, and Khamis Mushait. Two Egyptian Il-28s may have been shot down near Sanaa by Royal Saudi Air Force Hawker Hunters flown by British pilots, in 1966.

The Soviet Union was in the process of providing the type for local assembly in Cuba when this was halted by the Cuban Missile Crisis, after which Nikita Khrushchev agreed to remove them. The type also saw limited use in Vietnam and with the Afghan forces in Afghanistan. Four ex-Egyptian and two ex-Soviet Il-28s (all with Egyptian crews) were operated by the Nigerian Air Force in the Biafra Wars. Finland also had four examples of this type delivered between 1961 and 1966 for target-towing duties. They remained in service until the 1980s.

The Soviet Union had relegated the Il-28 to second-line duties by the late-1950s. The supersonic Yak-28 was introduced in the early 1960s to take over the Beagle's low-level attack role; some Il-28 variants lingered in Soviet service into the 1980s.<ref>The Yakovlev Yak-25 & Yak-28. Air Vectors.net.</ref> The last Soviet-built examples were still flying in Egypt into the 1990s.

The People's Republic of China received over 250 Soviet-built Il-28s from 1952, and when the Sino-Soviet split occurred in the late 1950s, it decided to place the Il-28 into production, despite no manufacturing license being obtained. Chinese-built aircraft differed from the original Soviet aircraft in that they have a redesigned wing structure, abandoning the horizontal manufacturing break, saving  at the cost of a more difficult construction. Chinese aircraft also used a different tail turret based on that of the Tupolev Tu-16, and fitted with faster-firing AM-23 cannons.

Chinese-built Il-28s designated H-5 and built by HAMC were still flying in the 1990s with several hundreds in China itself, and a smaller number in North Korea and Romania. The three main Chinese versions are the H-5 bomber, followed by the HJ-5 trainer, and the H-5R (HZ-5) long range (in comparison to the reconnaissance version of the Shenyang J-6) reconnaissance aircraft, and later, the HD-5 ECM/ESM version. The latter two types have been phased out.

The type is known to still be in active service with the North Korean Air Force, although little is known as to whether they are a mix of survivors from the batch of 24 Soviet-manufactured aircraft delivered in the 1960s and some of the newer Chinese-built H-5 variant, or are solely H-5s. Some of these are probably used for spares to maintain a small group of around a dozen serviceable aircraft. They give North Korea a means of bombing targets in South Korea and Western Japan, although they would be vulnerable to modern anti air missiles and interceptors.

Several Ilyushin Il-28s are preserved in museums and as monuments in Russia, Germany, Hungary and in other countries.

Variants

Soviet Union variants
Note: Order of variants determined chronologically by production/development dates.
Il-28
Basic three-seat bomber version, powered by two VK-1 engines.

Il-28U
Unarmed training version fitted with new nose housing cockpit for instructor, while the trainee sat in the normal cockpit. First flown 18 March 1950.
Il-28R
Three-seat tactical photo reconnaissance version, with extra fuel in bomb bay and tip-tanks, and with one forward firing cannon removed. Fitted with revised undercarriage to deal with heavier weights. First flew 19 April 1950.Gordon and Komissarov 1997, p. 14.
Il-28RTR
ELINT version of Il-28R.
Il-28REB
Electronic warfare, electronic jamming version, fitted with wingtip electronic pods housed in the former wing tanks.
Il-28T
Torpedo bomber version for the Soviet Naval Aviation able to accommodate two small or one large torpedo (including RAT-52 rocket propelled torpedoes) in a lengthened weapons bay.
Il-28N
Nuclear bomber for the Soviet Air Force with modified bomb-bay and revised avionics. (N - Nositel - carrier, also known as Il-28A - Atomnyy - atomic).
Il-28P
Unarmed civil conversion for Aeroflot, used as jet conversion trainer and to carry high priority cargo (i.e. newspaper matrices to allow simultaneous printing of Pravda and Izvestia in Moscow, Sverdlovsk and Novosibirsk). Also designated Ilyushin Il-20.Stroud 1968, pp. 126–127.
Il-28S
Proposed swept-wing version with more powerful Klimov VK-5 engines. Unbuilt.
Il-28RM
 Modified Il-28R with VK-5 engine. One prototype built plus two similarly converted bombers (which carried no special designation) but no production.
Il-28TM
Il-28T with VK-5. One converted, no production.
Il-28PL
High-speed anti-submarine conversion of Il-28 bomber or Il-28T torpedo bomber. Capable of carrying dropping sonobuoys or acoustic homing torpedoes on direction of other anti-submarine assets.
Il-28Sh
Ground attack (Shturmovik) conversion of Il-28 with 12 underwing pylons for rocket pods. Small number converted which saw limited service.Gordon, Komissarov and Komissarov 2004, p. 128.
Il-28ZA
Atmospheric sampling version.
Il-28M
Target drone conversion of Il-28. Also known as M-28.

Czechoslovak variants
B-228
Czechoslovak designation of Soviet built Il-28s.
CB-228
Czechoslovak designation of Soviet built Il-28Us.

Chinese variants
H-5
(Hongzhaji - bomber) - Standard three-seat tactical bomber. The structure of the two halves of the Soviet Union's IL-28 aircraft was changed to a common structure. The engine uses WP-5. The tail turret using H-6s caused some changes in the tail structure.
H-5A
Speculative designation of for nuclear capable H-5 variant.
HD-5
(Hongzhaji Dian - bomber/electronic reconnaissance) Chinese ECM jammer version.
HJ-5
(Hongzhaji Jiaolianji - bomber trainer) Chinese trainer version with similar layout to Il-28U.Gordon and Komissarov 2008, pp. 115–116
HZ-5
(Hongzhaji Zhenchaji - bomber/reconnaissance) Tactical reconnaissance aircraft. Fitted with underwing drop tanks instead of tip tanks of Il-28R.
B-5
Export designation of the H-5.
B-5R
Export version of HZ-5.
BT-5
Export version of the HJ-5.
H-5 Ying
(Ying - eagle) Avionics testbed for Xian JH-7 programme.
H-5B
Speculative designation for unflown H-5 testbed for WS-5 aft-fan engines.

Operators

Current

Korean People's Army Air Force - the only remaining operator of the type.

Former
Afghanistan
Afghan Air Force
54 aircraft acquired (including four Il-28U examples) from 1957. Only trainers were retained beyond 1994."Afghanistan (AFG), World Air Forces - Historical Listings."  worldairforces.com. Retrieved: 22 August 2011. All grounded during the civil war in the 1990s. Some were displayed during military parades such as the one in 1984.

Albanian Air Force
Aviation Regiment 4020 operated one Il-28 acquired in 1957 attached to 2 Skuadrilja (2nd Squadron). This aircraft was traded for an H-5, the Chinese version of the Soviet Il-28, in 1971 and retired from service in 1992.

Algerian Air Force
Fourteen Il-28s were ordered from the USSR in 1965-1966. At least twelve of them were donated to Egypt following the Six-Day War.

Bulgarian Air Force
14 Il-28Rs and one Il-28U received in 1955 and retired in 1974.

 Hundreds of these aircraft were operated by the People's Liberation Army Air Force and People's Liberation Army Navy Air Force. Originally equipped with Soviet-built aircraft, the Chinese began full production of the H-5 by 1965. All Il-28s are retired as of 2011.
 Second Aviation School

Cuban Air Force
A total of 42 were received in 1962, but soon returned to the Soviet Union as a result of the Cuban Missile Crisis.

Czechoslovak Air Force
Il-28 and Il-28Us locally designated B-228 and CB-228 which operated from 1954 until 1973. 90 Il-28s, 30 Il-28RTs and an unknown number of Il-28Us were delivered.

East German Air Force
Operated 12 Il-28s and one Il-28U aircraft, primarily on target tug and engine testing duties between 1954 and 1982.

Egyptian Air Force
Received 70 Czechoslovakia-built Il-28s in 1956, shortly before the Suez Crisis. The IDF rated the Il-28 as a high priority target during the Six-Day War.

Finnish Air Force
Received four aircraft (one IL-28 and three Il-28Rs), coded NH-1..4, in the 1960s. The aircraft were used as target tugs and for maritime reconnaissance and patrolling as well as aerial mapping until 1981. The code letters of the type (NH) originated from Neuvostoliittolainen Hinauskone (Soviet towplane) but since they also matched initials of the Soviet leader Nikita Khrushchev (spelled Hruštšov in Finnish), their usual nickname was Nikita.

Hungarian Air Force

Indonesian Air Force
21st Air Squadron based at Kemayoran Air Force Base, Jakarta received 12 Il-28s acquired in 1961. Aircraft were used during Operation Trikora in 1962 (the handover of Western New Guinea to Indonesia from the Netherlands). All of the aircraft were grounded in 1969 and retired in 1970.
Indonesian Navy
Received more than 30 Il-28T torpedo-bombers and six Il-28U trainers in 1961. They were based at Surabaya, in what is now Juanda International Airport. The last one was retired in 1972.

Iraqi Air Force
Received twelve Il-28s, two Il-28Us and two Il-28BM target tugs starting in January 1959. Some additional aircraft may have been acquired from Egypt in the 1960s. All destroyed or grounded after Desert Storm.

Royal Moroccan Air Force
Morocco operated two Il-28s.

Nigerian Air Force

Yemen Arab Republic Air Force
Four Il-28s donated by Libya in October 1972.

Pakistani Air Force
Operated a number of H-5s under the designation B-56. These aircraft served alongside American-built Martin B-57s. The H-5s were not popular with Pakistani pilots, and they were eventually traded back to China in exchange for more Shenyang F-6s.

Polish Air Force: Received 72 Il-28s, 15 Il-28Rs and 16 Il-28Us. The first aircraft arrived in 1952, last was retired in 1977.
7 Pułk Lotnictwa Bombowo-Rozpoznawczego was based in Powidz.
21 Pułk Rozpoznania Taktycznego operated Il-28R variant and was based in Sochaczew.
33 Pułk Lotnictwa Bombowego was based in Modlin.
Polish Navy

Romanian Air Force
About 22 Il-28s, three Il-28Rs and eight Il-28Us, both Soviet- and Chinese-built, operated from 1955. All remaining Il-28s were retired from service by June 2001.

Somali Air Force, 4 units prior to 1977.

People's Democratic Republic of Yemen Air Force
Received a single Il-28, one Il-28R and two Il-28Us from the USSR around 1972.

About 1,500 served with the Soviet Air Forces and the Soviet Navy (Soviet Naval Aviation), with operations beginning in 1950. Front line operations continued through the 1950s, with a few examples remaining into the 1980s. A small number of demilitarized aircraft were provided to Aeroflot.

Syrian Air Force
Syria operated six Il-28s. Two were destroyed during the Six-Day War. The other four were dumped in airbases around Syria. Replaced in 1980s by Su-24

Vietnam People's Air Force Retired.

Specifications (Il-28)

See also

References

Notes

Bibliography
 Bernád, Dénes. "Rumanian 'Beagles': The Ilyushin Il-28 in Rumanian Service". Air Enthusiast, No. 78, November/December 1998, pp. 68–72. ISSN 0143-5450.
 
 
 Gordon, Yefim and Dmitry Komissarov. Chinese Aircraft: China's Aviation Industry since 1951. Manchester, UK: Hikoki Publications, 2008. .
 Gordon, Yefim and Dmitry Komissarov. "Soviet Canberra: Ilyushin's incredible Il-28". Air Enthusiast, No. 71, September/October 1997, pp. 8–24. ISSN 0143-5450.
 Gordon, Yefim, Dmitry Komissarov and Sergei Komissarov. OKB Ilyushin: A History of the Design Bureau and Its Aircraft. Hinckley, Leicestershire, UK: Midland Publishing, 2004. .
 Green, William and Gordon Swanborough. "Il-28 ... A Quadragenarian Ilyushin". Air Enthusiast, Thirty-six, May–August 1988, pp. 39–51. ISSN 0143-5450.
 Gunston, Bill. The Osprey Encyclopedia of Russian Aircraft 1975–1995. London: Osprey, 1995. .
 Nemecek, Vaclav. The History of Soviet Aircraft from 1918. London: Willow Books, 1986. .

 Stroud, John. Soviet Transport Aircraft since 1945. London: Putnam, 1968. .
 Sweetman, Bill and Bill Gunston. Soviet Air Power: An Illustrated Encyclopedia of the Warsaw Pact Air Forces Today. London: Salamander Books, 1978. .
 Taylor, John W. R. Jane's All The World's Aircraft 1982–83. London: Jane's Yearbooks, 1982. .
 Winchester, Jim, ed. "Ilyushin Il-28 'Beagle'." Military Aircraft of the Cold War'' (The Aviation Factfile). London: Grange Books plc, 2006. .

External links

 Walkaround Il-28 Beagle for Hodynskoye pole, Moscow, Russia
  Russia's New 2-Jet Bomber by Chamlers Goodlin, one of the earliest articles printed in the US on the Il-28 with cutaway drawing, published 1951

Il-028
1940s Soviet bomber aircraft
Aircraft first flown in 1948
High-wing aircraft
Twinjets